Riding The Nuclear Tiger is the fourth album by bassist Ben Allison. It was released on the Palmetto Records label in 2001.

Track list
All compositions by Ben Allison, except where noted.

 Riding the Nuclear Tiger
 Jazz Scene Voyeur
 Love Chant Remix
 Swiss Cheese D
 Weazy
 Charlie Brown's Psychedelic Christmas
 Harlem River Line (Michael Blake)
 Mysterious Visitor
 Tectonics

Personnel
 Ben Allison – bass, guitar
 Michael Blake – saxophones
 Ted Nash – saxophones
 Tomas Ulrich – cello
 Frank Kimbrough – piano
 Ron Horton – trumpet
 Jeff Ballard – drums

References

External links
 benallison.com - Riding The Nuclear Tiger

2001 albums
Ben Allison albums
Palmetto Records albums